Twin Sisters is a 2002 Dutch film, directed by Ben Sombogaart, based on the novel The Twins by Tessa de Loo, with a screenplay by Dutch actress and writer Marieke van der Pol.

Plot 
The film tells the story of twin German sisters Lotte (Thekla Reuten) and Anna (Nadja Uhl), who are separated when they are six. After the deaths of their parents, they are "divided" between quarreling distant relatives, one being raised in the Netherlands and the other in Germany.  Lotte grows up in a loving middle-class intellectual family in Amsterdam, and Anna is raised in virtual servitude by a poor Catholic peasant family in a backward area.

The two girls seek to keep in contact, but Anna's family lacks Lotte's address, and Lotte's new family fails to mail her letters for fear that the brutal farmers will claim her, as well.  The cataclysmic events of World War II sweep them even further apart. Lotte falls in love with a young Jewish man whom the Nazis eventually caught and sent to an extermination camp where they killed him. Anna falls in love and marries a young Wehrmacht soldier who joins the Waffen SS and is killed in the last days of the war. Although the girls find each other just before the outbreak of the war, Anna's attempt to reunite with Lotte in its aftermath is thwarted by Lotte's bitter discovery that Anna's husband had been part of Nazism which killed her fiancé in Auschwitz.

Only in her old age, when they meet again at a spa, does Lotte reconcile herself to their divergent lives and reclaim the tender sibling feeling of her childhood. The two girls/women are each played by three different actors from the Netherlands and Germany.

Cast 
 Ellen Vogel - old Lotte
 Gudrun Okras - old Anna
 Thekla Reuten - young Lotte
 Nadja Uhl - young Anna
 Julia Koopmans - little Lotte
 Sina Richardt - little Anna
 Betty Schuurman - the twins' mother
  - the twins' father

Reception 
Twin Sisters has an approval rating of 69% on review aggregator website Rotten Tomatoes, based on 13 reviews, and an average rating of 6.92/10.

In Israel, some critics objected to the film as "creating a moral equation between the killers and their victims". Still, it was shown successfully for several months in cinemas all over Israel. As the Jewish Chronicle was later to remark,
A thought-provoking film, raises big questions about responsibility for the Holocaust and what ordinary individuals do when faced with extraordinary evil.

Miramax Films had also acquired the United States distribution rights to Twin Sisters and the film was given a limited US theatrical release in 2005.

The film was a 76th Academy Awards nominee for Academy Award for Best Foreign Language Film of 2003.

It also won the Golden Calf for Best Feature Film.

Box office 
The film received commercial release on May 6, 2005, and grossed  $1,207 in the opening weekend in one theater (US). It went on to gross $1,563 in the US and $5,143,800 in other markets for a worldwide total of $5,145,363.

References

External links
 

Movie stills

2002 films
2002 drama films
Dutch drama films
2000s Dutch-language films
Films about twin sisters
Films based on Dutch novels
Films set in the Netherlands
Films shot in the Netherlands
Holocaust films
Films set in the 1930s
Films set in the 1940s
Films set in Germany
Films shot in Amsterdam
Films shot in Belgium
Films shot in Luxembourg
Films directed by Ben Sombogaart
Twins in fiction